Judas Iscariot was an American black metal band. It began in 1992 as the solo-project of Andrew Harris, who performed under the pseudonym Akhenaten (after the Egyptian Pharaoh of the same name).

With the release of Heaven in Flames (1999), Duane Timlin (aka Cryptic Winter) joined the band as a session drummer. During 1999 and 2000, Akhenaten twice performed live with a line-up featuring members from Nargaroth, Krieg, Absu and Maniac Butcher.

After relocating to Germany, Akhenaten announced the demise of Judas Iscariot on August 25, 2002.

Ideology
Akhenaten considered the story of the band Judas Iscariot as documentation of one individual's struggle against the moral boundaries set by Christianity. Furthermore, he expressed contempt towards capitalism, which he dismissed as inextricably linked to materialism. Akhenaten stated that his music was intended to give others strength to live in a world compromised by materialism and irrational religious ideology.

Some of the lyrics on early Judas Iscariot albums are borrowed from the works of English poet and Christian mystic William Blake, as well as from English poet Percy Bysshe Shelly, fundamental for understanding the connection between Dark Romanticism, the esoteric and their connection to heavy metal lyrics.

Akhenaten repeatedly denied association with the National Socialist black metal movement. In an interview he stated "Judas Iscariot is no Nazi band. I myself am no Nazi either [...] If other bands think they have to include politics into their music, it's their business, but this has nothing to do with my band."

Line-up 
 Akhenaten (Andrew Harris) – vocals, guitar, bass and drums
 Cryptic Winter (Duane Timlin) – session drums (1999–2001)
 Kanwulf (René Wagner) – live guitar
 Lord Imperial (Neill Jameson) – live bass (1999–2000)
 Proscriptor (Russley Randel Givens) – live drums (1999)
 Butcher (real name unknown) – live drums (2000)

Discography

Full-length albums 
 The Cold Earth Slept Below (1996)
 Thy Dying Light (1996)
 Of Great Eternity (1997)
 Distant in Solitary Night (1999)
 Heaven in Flames (2000)
 To Embrace the Corpses Bleeding (2002)
 An Ancient Starry Sky (2018)

EPs 
 Arise, My Lord (1996)
 Dethroned, Conquered and Forgotten (2000)
 March of the Apocalypse (2002)
 Moonlight Butchery (2002)
 Midnight Frost (To Rest with Eternity) (2003)

Split albums 
 Judas Iscariot/Weltmacht (with Weltmacht) (1999)
 None Shall Escape the Wrath (with Krieg, Eternal Majesty and Macabre Omen) (2000)
To the Coming Age of Intolerance (with Krieg) (2001)

Live releases 
 Under the Black Sun (2000)

Compilation albums 
 From Hateful Visions (2000)
 Midnight Frost (To Rest with Eternity) (2002)

Demos 
 Heidegger (1992)
 Judas Iscariot (1993)

References

External links 
 Judas Iscariot on No Colours Records

American black metal musical groups
Heavy metal musical groups from Illinois
Musical groups established in 1992
Musical groups disestablished in 2002
One-man bands
Black metal controversies